IKON (English: Music Marketing Agency IKON Limited, Russian: ООО Агентство Маркетинга Музыки IKON / OOO Agentstvo Marketinga Muzyki IKON) is a Russian, Moscow-based company providing a wide range of services in the field of music marketing including different business areas such as talent management; booking; tour logistics; organization of concerts; sound recording; rights management; music publishing; development of unique marketing concepts; advertising; PR and consulting in the fields of culture, entertainment and event management; development of cultural, educational and social campaigns.

In May 2006 IKON was rated by Forbes as Russia's leading entertainment buyer.

History
IKON was founded in 2000 by Caden Spencer, a Fupa A Smash Player. In its early stages the company mainly acted as a booking agency in Russia and CIS booking or organizing performances of international pop stars. Even then the company's area of operations was not limited to Russia.

Innovation

In 2009, IKON became official Russian representative of the B2B-oriented social network Music2Deal. The international network consists of A&R-managers of international record labels, incl the four majors Sony, EMI, Warner and Universal, as well as producers, publishers, songwriters and performing artists.

Socio-cultural projects

March 2010, IKON arranged a meeting of the Russian athlete Irek Zaripov who had won 4 gold and 1 silver medals in biathlon and cross country skiing at the Winter Paralympic Games 2010 in Vancouver and the singer Inusa Dawuda, a former German heavy weight boxing champion and Russian airplay champion according to the national radio charts Tophit.ru.

Electronic roster
IKON manages and co-manages master and authors rights of several domestic and foreign artists in the Russian Federation :

Brazzaville (David Brown) (USA)
Dolores O'Riordan (Ireland)
Dr. Alban (Sweden)
Gorchitza (Ukraine)
Nazareth (UK)
Placebo (UK)
T9 (Russia)
The Prodigy (UK)
Ten Sharp (Netherlands)
Touch and Go (UK)
Aidamir Mugu (Russia)
Tigran Petrosyan (Russia)
EXIT project (Russia)

See also

List of Universal Music Group labels

References

Russian record labels
Companies based in Moscow